Thibault Vialla (born 7 January 1996) is a French professional footballer who plays as an attacking midfielder for  club Red Star. He previously played in Ligue 2 for Ajaccio and for Dunkerque.

Career
Vialla made his professional debut for AC Ajaccio in a 2–1 Ligue 2 loss to Clermont Foot on 20 March 2015. He signed his first professional contract with Ajaccio on 26 May 2017. After his contract expired in the summer of 2018, he was without a club for several months before signing for Le Mans of the Championnat National. In August 2019 he signed with Dunkerque.

References

External links
 
 
 Foot-national Profile

1996 births
Living people
French footballers
Footballers from Toulouse
Association football midfielders
AC Ajaccio players
Le Mans FC players
USL Dunkerque players
Red Star F.C. players
Ligue 2 players
Championnat National players